Samawal Merghani Noureldin Elyas (born 22 October 1991) is a Sudanese professional footballer who plays as a defender for Al Ahli SC (Khartoum) and the Sudan national football team.

References

External links 

 

Living people
1991 births
Sudanese footballers
Sudan international footballers
Al Khartoum SC players
Al-Hilal Club (Omdurman) players
Association football fullbacks
Sudan A' international footballers
2018 African Nations Championship players